Akkadian is an extinct East Semitic language that was spoken in ancient Mesopotamia (Akkad, Assyria, Isin, Larsa and Babylonia) from the third millennium BC until its gradual replacement by Akkadian-influenced Old Aramaic among Mesopotamians by the 8th century BC.

It is the earliest documented Semitic language. It used the cuneiform script, which was originally used to write the unrelated, and also extinct, Sumerian (which is a language isolate). Akkadian is named after the city of Akkad, a major centre of Mesopotamian civilization during the Akkadian Empire (c. 2334–2154 BC). The mutual influence between Sumerian and Akkadian had led scholars to describe the languages as a Sprachbund.

Akkadian proper names were first attested in Sumerian texts from around the mid 3rd-millennium BC. From about the 25th or 24th century BC, texts fully written in Akkadian begin to appear. By the 10th century BC, two variant forms of the language were in use in Assyria and Babylonia, known as Assyrian and Babylonian respectively. The bulk of preserved material is from this later period, corresponding to the Near Eastern Iron Age. In total, hundreds of thousands of texts and text fragments have been excavated, covering a vast textual tradition of mythological narrative, legal texts, scientific works, correspondence, political and military events, and many other examples.

Centuries after the fall of the Akkadian Empire, Akkadian (in its Assyrian and Babylonian varieties) was the native language of the Mesopotamian empires (Old Assyrian Empire, Babylonia, Middle Assyrian Empire) throughout the later Bronze Age, and became the lingua franca of much of the Ancient Near East by the time of the Bronze Age collapse c. 1150 BC. Its decline began in the Iron Age,   during the Neo-Assyrian Empire, by about the 8th century BC (Tiglath-Pileser III), in favour of Old Aramaic.  By the Hellenistic period, the language was largely confined to scholars and priests working in temples in Assyria and Babylonia. The last known Akkadian cuneiform document dates from the 1st century AD. Mandaic and Suret are two (Northwest Semitic) Neo-Aramaic languages that retain some Akkadian vocabulary and grammatical features.

Akkadian is a fusional language with grammatical case; and like all Semitic languages, Akkadian uses the system of consonantal roots. The Kültepe texts, which were written in Old Assyrian, include Hittite loanwords and names, which constitute the oldest record of any Indo-European language.

Classification

Akkadian belongs with the other Semitic languages in the Near Eastern branch of the Afroasiatic languages, a family native to the Middle East, Arabian Peninsula, the Horn of Africa, parts of Anatolia, North Africa, Malta, Canary Islands and parts of West Africa (Hausa). Akkadian and its successor Aramaic, however, are only ever attested in Mesopotamia and the Near East.

Within the Near Eastern Semitic languages, Akkadian forms an East Semitic subgroup (with Eblaite). This group distinguishes itself from the Northwest and South Semitic languages by its subject–object–verb word order, while the other Semitic languages usually have either a verb–subject–object or subject–verb–object order.

Additionally Akkadian is the only Semitic language to use the prepositions ina and ana (locative case, English in/on/with, and dative-locative case, for/to, respectively). Other Semitic languages like Arabic, Hebrew and Aramaic have the prepositions bi/bə and li/lə (locative and dative, respectively). The origin of the Akkadian spatial prepositions is unknown.

In contrast to most other Semitic languages, Akkadian has only one non-sibilant fricative: ḫ . Akkadian lost both the glottal and pharyngeal fricatives, which are characteristic of the other Semitic languages. Until the Old Babylonian period, the Akkadian sibilants were exclusively affricated.

History and writing

Writing

Old Akkadian is preserved on clay tablets dating back to c. 2500 BC. It was written using cuneiform, a script adopted from the Sumerians using wedge-shaped symbols pressed in wet clay. As employed by Akkadian scribes, the adapted cuneiform script could represent either (a) Sumerian logograms (i.e., picture-based characters representing entire words), (b) Sumerian syllables, (c) Akkadian syllables, or (d) phonetic complements. However, in Akkadian the script practically became a fully fledged syllabic script, and the original logographic nature of cuneiform became secondary, though logograms for frequent words such as 'god' and 'temple' continued to be used. For this reason, the sign AN can on the one hand be a logogram for the word ilum ('god') and on the other signify the god Anu or even the syllable -an-. Additionally, this sign was used as a determinative for divine names.

Another peculiarity of Akkadian cuneiform is that many signs do not have a well-defined phonetic value. Nor is there any coordination in the other direction; the syllable , for example, is rendered by the sign , but also by the sign . Both of these are often used for the same syllable in the same text.

Cuneiform was in many ways unsuited to Akkadian: among its flaws was its inability to represent important phonemes in Semitic, including a glottal stop, pharyngeals, and emphatic consonants. In addition, cuneiform was a syllabary writing system—i.e., a consonant plus vowel comprised one writing unit—frequently inappropriate for a Semitic language made up of triconsonantal roots (i.e., three consonants plus any vowels).

Development
Akkadian is divided into several varieties based on geography and historical period:
Old Akkadian, 2500–1950 BC
Old Babylonian and Old Assyrian, 1950–1530 BC
Middle Babylonian and Middle Assyrian, 1530–1000 BC
Neo-Babylonian and Neo-Assyrian, 1000–600 BC
Late Babylonian, 600 BC–100 AD

One of the earliest known Akkadian inscriptions was found on a bowl at Ur, addressed to the very early pre-Sargonic king Meskiagnunna of Ur (c. 2485–2450 BC) by his queen Gan-saman, who is thought to have been from Akkad. The Akkadian Empire, established by Sargon of Akkad, introduced the Akkadian language (the "language of Akkad") as a written language, adapting Sumerian cuneiform orthography for the purpose. During the Middle Bronze Age (Old Assyrian and Old Babylonian period), the language virtually displaced Sumerian, which is assumed to have been extinct as a living language by the 18th century BC.

Old Akkadian, which was used until the end of the 3rd millennium BC, differed from both Babylonian and Assyrian, and was displaced by these dialects. By the 21st century BC Babylonian and Assyrian, which were to become the primary dialects, were easily distinguishable. Old Babylonian, along with the closely related dialect Mariotic, is clearly more innovative than the Old Assyrian dialect and the more distantly related Eblaite language. For this reason, forms like lu-prus ('I will decide') were first encountered in Old Babylonian instead of the older la-prus. While generally more archaic, Assyrian developed certain innovations as well, such as the "Assyrian vowel harmony". Eblaite was even more so, retaining a productive dual and a relative pronoun declined in case, number and gender. Both of these had already disappeared in Old Akkadian. Over 20,000 cuneiform tablets in Old Assyrian have been recovered from the Kültepe site in Anatolia.
Most of the archaeological evidence is typical of Anatolia rather than of Assyria, but the use both of cuneiform and the dialect is the best indication of Assyrian presence.

Old Babylonian was the language of king Hammurabi and his code, which is one of the oldest collections of laws in the world. (see Code of Ur-Nammu.) The Middle Babylonian (or Assyrian) period started in the 16th century BC. The division is marked by the Kassite invasion of Babylonia around 1550 BC. The Kassites, who reigned for 300 years, gave up their own language in favor of Akkadian, but they had little influence on the language. At its apogee, Middle Babylonian was the written language of diplomacy of the entire Ancient Near East, including Egypt. During this period, a large number of loan words were included in the language from Northwest Semitic languages and Hurrian; however, the use of these words was confined to the fringes of the Akkadian-speaking territory.

Middle Assyrian served as a lingua franca in much of the Ancient Near East of the Late Bronze Age (Amarna Period). During the Neo-Assyrian Empire, Neo-Assyrian began to turn into a chancellery language, being marginalized by Old Aramaic. Under the Achaemenids, Aramaic continued to prosper, but Assyrian continued its decline. The language's final demise came about during the Hellenistic period when it was further marginalized by Koine Greek, even though Neo-Assyrian cuneiform remained in use in literary tradition well into Parthian times. The latest known text in cuneiform Babylonian is an astronomical almanac dated to 79/80 AD. However, the latest cuneiform texts are almost entirely written in Sumerian logograms.

Old Assyrian developed as well during the second millennium BC, but because it was a purely popular language — kings wrote in Babylonian — few long texts are preserved. From 1500 BC onwards, the language is termed Middle Assyrian.

During the first millennium BC, Akkadian progressively lost its status as a lingua franca. In the beginning, from around 1000 BC, Akkadian and Aramaic were of equal status, as can be seen in the number of copied texts: clay tablets were written in Akkadian, while scribes writing on papyrus and leather used Aramaic. From this period on, one speaks of Neo-Babylonian and Neo-Assyrian. Neo-Assyrian received an upswing in popularity in the 10th century BC when the Assyrian kingdom became a major power with the Neo-Assyrian Empire, but texts written 'exclusively' in Neo-Assyrian disappear within 10 years of Nineveh's destruction in 612 BC. The dominance of the Neo-Assyrian Empire under Tiglath-Pileser III over Aram-Damascus in the middle of the 8th century led to the establishment of Aramaic as a lingua franca of the empire, rather than it being eclipsed by Akkadian.

After the end of the Mesopotamian kingdoms, which were conquered by the Persians, Akkadian (which existed solely in the form of Late Babylonian) disappeared as a popular language. However, the language was still used in its written form; and even after the Greek invasion under Alexander the Great in the 4th century BC, Akkadian was still a contender as a written language, but spoken Akkadian was likely extinct by this time, or at least rarely used.  The last positively identified Akkadian text comes from the 1st century AD.

Decipherment

The Akkadian language began to be rediscovered when Carsten Niebuhr in 1767 was able to make extensive copies of cuneiform texts and published them in Denmark. The deciphering of the texts started immediately, and bilinguals, in particular Old Persian-Akkadian bilinguals, were of great help. Since the texts contained several royal names, isolated signs could be identified, and were presented in 1802 by Georg Friedrich Grotefend. By this time it was already evident that Akkadian was a Semitic language, and the final breakthrough in deciphering the language came from Edward Hincks, Henry Rawlinson and Jules Oppert in the middle of the 19th century.

Dialects
The following table summarises the dialects of Akkadian identified with certainty so far.

Some researchers (such as W. Sommerfeld 2003) believe that the Old Akkadian variant used in the older texts is not an ancestor of the later Assyrian and Babylonian dialects, but rather a separate dialect that was replaced by these two dialects and which died out early.

Eblaite, formerly thought of as yet another Akkadian dialect, is now generally considered a separate East Semitic language.

Phonetics and phonology

Because Akkadian as a spoken language is extinct and no contemporary descriptions of the pronunciation are known, little can be said with certainty about the phonetics and phonology of Akkadian. Some conclusions can be made, however, due to the relationship to the other Semitic languages and variant spellings of Akkadian words.

Consonants
The following table presents the consonants of the Akkadian language, as distinguished in Akkadian cuneiform. The reconstructed phonetic value of a phoneme is given in IPA transcription, alongside its standard (DMG-Umschrift) transliteration in angle brackets .

Reconstruction 

Akkadian emphatic consonants are typically reconstructed as ejectives, which are thought to be the oldest realization of emphatics across the Semitic languages. One piece of evidence for this is that Akkadian shows a development known as Geers' law, where one of two emphatic consonants dissimilates to the corresponding non-emphatic consonant. For the sibilants, traditionally /š/ has been held to be postalveolar , and /s/, /z/, // analyzed as fricatives; but attested assimilations in Akkadian suggest otherwise. For example, when the possessive suffix -šu is added to the root awat ('word'), it is written awassu ('his word') even though šš would be expected. The most straightforward interpretation of this shift from tš to ss is that /s, ṣ/ form a pair of voiceless alveolar affricates , *š is a voiceless alveolar fricative , and *z is a voiced alveolar affricate or fricative . The assimilation is then [awat+su] > . In this vein, an alternative transcription of *š is *s̠, with the macron below indicating a soft (lenis) articulation in Semitic transcription.

The phoneme /r/ has traditionally been interpreted as a trill but its pattern of alternation with // suggests it was a velar (or uvular) fricative. In the Hellenistic period, Akkadian /r/ was transcribed using the Greek ρ, indicating it was pronounced similarly as an alveolar trill (though Greeks may also have perceived a uvular trill as ρ).

Descent from Proto-Semitic 
Several Proto-Semitic phonemes are lost in Akkadian. The voiceless lateral fricatives merged with the sibilants as in Canaanite, leaving 19 consonantal phonemes. Old Akkadian preserved the /*ś/ phoneme longest but it eventually merged with /*š/, beginning in the Old Babylonian period. The following table shows Proto-Semitic phonemes and their correspondences among Akkadian, Modern Standard Arabic and Tiberian Hebrew:

Vowels

The existence of a back mid-vowel  has been proposed, but the cuneiform writing gives no good proof for this. There is limited contrast between different u-signs in lexical texts, but this scribal differentiation may reflect the superimposition of the Sumerian phonological system (for which an /o/ phoneme has also been proposed), rather than a separate phoneme in Akkadian.

All consonants and vowels appear in long and short forms. Long consonants are transliterated as double consonants, and inconsistently written as such in cuneiform. Long vowels are transliterated with a macron (ā, ē, ī, ū) or a circumflex (â, ê, î, û), the latter being used for long vowels arising from the contraction of vowels in hiatus. The distinction between long and short is phonemic, and is used in the grammar; for example, iprusu ('that he decided') versus iprusū ('they decided').

Stress
The stress patterns of Akkadian are disputed, with some authors claiming that nothing is known of the topic. There are, however, certain points of reference, such as the rule of vowel syncope, and some forms in the cuneiform that might represent the stressing of certain vowels; however, attempts at identifying a rule for stress have so far been unsuccessful.

Huenergard claims that stress in Akkadian is completely predictable. In his syllable typology there are three syllable weights: light (V, CV); heavy (CVC, CV̄, CV̂), and superheavy (CV̂C). If the last syllable is superheavy, it is stressed, otherwise the rightmost heavy non-final syllable is stressed. If a word contains only light syllables, the first syllable is stressed.

A rule of Akkadian phonology is that certain short (and probably unstressed) vowels are dropped. The rule is that the last vowel of a succession of syllables that end in a short vowel is dropped, for example the declinational root of the verbal adjective of a root PRS is PaRiS-. Thus the masculine singular nominative is PaRS-um (< *PaRiS-um) but the feminine singular nominative is PaRiStum (< *PaRiS-at-um). Additionally there is a general tendency of syncope of short vowels in the later stages of Akkadian.

Grammar

Morphology

Consonantal root
Most roots of the Akkadian language consist of three consonants (called the radicals), but some roots are composed of four consonants (so-called quadriradicals). The radicals are occasionally represented in transcription in upper-case letters, for example PRS (to decide). Between and around these radicals various infixes, suffixes and prefixes, having word generating or grammatical functions, are inserted. The resulting consonant-vowel pattern differentiates the original meaning of the root. Also, the middle radical can be geminated, which is represented by a doubled consonant in transcription (and sometimes in the cuneiform writing itself).

Case, number and gender 
Formally, Akkadian has three numbers (singular, dual and plural) and three cases (nominative, accusative and genitive). However, even in the earlier stages of the language, the dual number is vestigial, and its use is largely confined to natural pairs (eyes, ears, etc.), and adjectives are never found in the dual. In the dual and plural, the accusative and genitive are merged into a single oblique case.

Akkadian, unlike Arabic, has only "sound" plurals formed by means of a plural ending; broken plurals are not formed by changing the word stem. As in all Semitic languages, some masculine nouns take the prototypically feminine plural ending (-āt).

The nouns šarrum (king) and šarratum (queen) and the adjective dannum (strong) will serve to illustrate the case system of Akkadian.

As is clear from the above table, the adjective and noun endings differ only in the masculine plural. Certain nouns, primarily those referring to geography, can also form a locative ending in -um in the singular and the resulting forms serve as adverbials. These forms are generally not productive, but in the Neo-Babylonian the um-locative replaces several constructions with the preposition ina.

In the later stages of Akkadian, the mimation (word-final -m) and nunation (dual final -n) that occurred at the end of most case endings disappeared, except in the locative. Later, the nominative and accusative singular of masculine nouns collapsed to -u and in Neo-Babylonian most word-final short vowels were dropped. As a result, case differentiation disappeared from all forms except masculine plural nouns. However, many texts continued the practice of writing the case endings, although often sporadically and incorrectly. As the most important contact language throughout this period was Aramaic, which itself lacks case distinctions, it is possible that Akkadian's loss of cases was an areal as well as phonological phenomenon.

Noun states and nominal sentences
 
As is also the case in other Semitic languages, Akkadian nouns may appear in a variety of "states" depending on their grammatical function in a sentence. The basic form of the noun is the status rectus (the governed state), which is the form as described above, complete with case endings. In addition to this, Akkadian has the status absolutus (the absolute state) and the status constructus (construct state). The latter is found in all other Semitic languages, while the former appears only in Akkadian and some dialects of Aramaic.

The status absolutus is characterised by the loss of a noun's case ending (e.g. awīl < awīlum, šar < šarrum). It is relatively uncommon, and is used chiefly to mark the predicate of a nominal sentence, in fixed adverbial expressions, and in expressions relating to measurements of length, weight, and the like.

The status constructus is more common by far, and has a much wider range of applications. It is employed when a noun is followed by another noun in the genitive, a pronominal suffix, or a verbal clause in the subjunctive, and typically takes the shortest form of the noun which is phonetically possible. In general, this amounts to the loss of case endings with short vowels, with the exception of the genitive -i in nouns preceding a pronominal suffix, hence:

but

There are numerous exceptions to this general rule, usually involving potential violations of the language's phonological limitations. Most obviously, Akkadian does not tolerate word-final consonant clusters, so nouns like kalbum (dog) and maḫrum (front) would have illegal construct state forms *kalb and *maḫr unless modified. In many of these instances, the first vowel of the word is simply repeated (e.g. kalab, maḫar). This rule, however, does not always hold true, especially in nouns where a short vowel has historically been elided (e.g. šaknum < *šakinum "governor"). In these cases, the lost vowel is restored in the construct state (so šaknum yields šakin).

A genitive relation can also be expressed with the relative preposition ša, and the noun that the genitive phrase depends on appears in status rectus.

The same preposition is also used to introduce true relative clauses, in which case the verb is placed in the subjunctive mood.

Verbal morphology

Verb aspects
The Akkadian verb has six finite verb aspects (preterite,  perfect, present, imperative, precative, and vetitive (the negative form of precative)) and three infinite forms (infinitive, participle and verbal adjective). The preterite is used for actions that are seen by the speaker as having occurred at a single point in time. The present is primarily imperfective in meaning and is used for concurrent and future actions as well as past actions with a temporal dimension. The final three finite forms are injunctive where the imperative and the precative together form a paradigm for positive commands and wishes, and the vetitive is used for negative wishes. Additionally the periphrastic prohibitive, formed by the present form of the verb and the negative adverb lā, is used to express negative commands. The infinitive of the Akkadian verb is a verbal noun, and in contrast to some other languages the Akkadian infinitive can be declined in case. The verbal adjective is an adjectival form and designates the state or the result of the action of the verb, and consequently the exact meaning of the verbal adjective is determined by the semantics of the verb itself. The participle, which can be active or passive, is another verbal adjective and its meaning is similar to the English gerund.

The following table shows the conjugation of the G-stem verbs derived from the root PRS ("to decide") in the various verb aspects of Akkadian:

The table below shows the different affixes attached to the preterite aspect of the verb root PRS "to decide"; and as can be seen, the grammatical genders differ only in the second person singular and third person plural.

Verb moods
Akkadian verbs have 3 moods:
Indicative, used in independent clauses, is unmarked.
Subjunctive, used in dependent clauses. The subjunctive is marked in forms which do not end in a vowel by the suffix -u (compare Arabic and Ugaritic subjunctives), but is otherwise unmarked. In the later stages of most dialects, the subjunctive is indistinct, as short final vowels were mostly lost
Venitive or allative. The venitive is not a mood in the strictest sense, being a development of the 1st person dative pronominal suffix -am/-m/-nim. With verbs of motion, it often indicates motion towards an object or person (e.g. illik, "he went" vs. illikam, "he came"). However, this pattern is not consistent, even in earlier stages of the language, and its use often appears to serve a stylistic rather than morphological or lexical function.

The following table demonstrates the verb moods of verbs derived from the root PRS ("to decide","to separate"):

Verb patterns
Akkadian verbs have thirteen separate derived stems formed on each root. The basic, underived, stem is the G-stem (from the German Grundstamm, meaning "basic stem"). Causative or intensive forms are formed with the doubled D-stem, and it gets its name from the doubled-middle radical that is characteristic of this form. The doubled middle radical is also characteristic of the present, but the forms of the D-stem use the secondary conjugational affixes, so a D-form will never be identical to a form in a different stem. The Š-stem is formed by adding a prefix š-, and these forms are mostly causatives. Finally, the passive forms of the verb are in the N-stem, formed by adding a n- prefix. However the n- element is assimilated to a following consonant, so the original /n/ is only visible in a few forms.

Furthermore, reflexive and iterative verbal stems can be derived from each of the basic stems. The reflexive stem is formed with an infix -ta, and the derived stems are therefore called Gt, Dt, Št and Nt, and the preterite forms of the Xt-stem are identical to the perfects of the X-stem. Iteratives are formed with the infix -tan-, giving the Gtn, Dtn, Štn and Ntn. Because of the assimilation of n, the /n/ is only seen in the present forms, and the Xtn preterite is identical to the Xt durative.

The final stem is the ŠD-stem, a form mostly attested only in poetic texts, and whose meaning is usually identical to either the Š-stem or the D-stem of the same verb.  It is formed with the Š prefix (like the Š-stem) in addition to a doubled-middle radical (like the D-stem).

An alternative to this naming system is a numerical system. The basic stems are numbered using Roman numerals so that G, D, Š and N become I, II, III and IV, respectively, and the infixes are numbered using Arabic numerals; 1 for the forms without an infix, 2 for the Xt, and 3 for the Xtn. The two numbers are separated using a solidus. As an example, the Štn-stem is called III/3. The most important user of this system is the Chicago Assyrian Dictionary.

There is mandatory congruence between the subject of the sentence and the verb, and this is expressed by prefixes and suffixes. There are two different sets of affixes, a primary set used for the forms of the G and N-stems, and a secondary set for the D and Š-stems.

The stems, their nomenclature and examples of the third-person masculine singular stative of the verb parāsum (root PRS: 'to decide, distinguish, separate') is shown below:

Stative
A very often appearing form which can be formed by nouns, adjectives as well as by verbal adjectives is the stative. Nominal predicatives occur in the status absolutus and correspond to the verb "to be" in English. The stative in Akkadian corresponds to the Egyptian pseudo-participle. The following table contains an example of using the noun šarrum (king), the adjective rapšum (wide) and the verbal adjective parsum (decided).

Thus, the stative in Akkadian is used to convert simple stems into effective sentences, so that the form šarr-āta is equivalent to: "you were king", "you are king" and "you will be king". Hence, the stative is independent of time forms.

Derivation
Beside the already explained possibility of derivation of different verb stems, Akkadian has numerous nominal formations derived from verb roots. A very frequently encountered form is the maPRaS form. It can express the location of an event, the person performing the act and many other meanings. If one of the root consonants is labial (p, b, m), the prefix becomes na- (maPRaS > naPRaS).  Examples for this are: maškanum (place, location) from ŠKN (set, place, put), mašraḫum (splendour) from ŠRḪ (be splendid), maṣṣarum (guards) from NṢR (guard), napḫarum (sum) from  PḪR (summarize).

A very similar formation is the maPRaSt form. The noun derived from this nominal formation is grammatically feminine. The same rules as for the maPRaS form apply, for example maškattum (deposit) from ŠKN (set, place, put), narkabtum (carriage) from RKB (ride, drive, mount).

The suffix - ūt is used to derive abstract nouns. The nouns which are formed with this suffix are grammatically feminine. The suffix can be attached to nouns, adjectives and verbs, e.g. abūtum (paternity) from abum (father), rabûtum (size) from rabûm (large), waṣûtum (leaving) from WṢY (leave).

Also derivatives of verbs from nouns, adjectives and numerals are numerous. For the most part, a D-stem is derived from the root of the noun or adjective. The derived verb then has the meaning of "make X do something" or "becoming X", for example: duššûm (let sprout) from dīšum (grass), šullušum (to do something for the third time ) from šalāš (three).

Pronouns

Personal pronouns

Independent personal pronouns
Independent personal pronouns in Akkadian are as follows:

Suffixed (or enclitic) pronouns
Suffixed (or enclitic) pronouns (mainly denoting the genitive, accusative and dative) are as follows:

Demonstrative pronouns
Demonstrative pronouns in Akkadian differ from the Western Semitic variety. The following tables show the Akkadian demonstrative pronouns according to near and far deixis:

Relative pronouns
Relative pronouns in Akkadian are shown in the following table:

Unlike plural relative pronouns, singular relative pronouns in Akkadian exhibit full declension for case. However, only the form ša (originally accusative masculine singular) survived, while the other forms disappeared in time.

Interrogative pronouns
The following table shows the interrogative pronouns used in Akkadian:
{| class="wikitable"
! Akkadian
! English
|-
| mannum||who?
|-
| mīnum, minûm||what?
|-
| ayyum||which?
|-
|}

Prepositions
Akkadian has prepositions which consist mainly of only one word. For example: ina (in, on, out, through, under), ana (to, for, after, approximately), adi (to), aššum (because of), eli (up, over), ištu/ultu (of, since), mala (in accordance with), itti (also, with). There are, however, some compound prepositions which are combined with ina and ana (e.g. ina maḫar (forwards), ina balu (without), ana ṣēr (up to), ana maḫar (forwards). Regardless of the complexity of the preposition, the following noun is always in the genitive case.

Examples: ina bītim (in the house, from the house), ana dummuqim (to do good), itti šarrim (with the king), ana ṣēr mārīšu (up to his son).

Numerals
Since numerals are written mostly as a number sign in the cuneiform script, the transliteration of many numerals is not well ascertained yet. Along with the counted noun, the cardinal numerals are in the status absolutus. Because other cases are very rare, the forms of the status rectus are known only by isolated numerals. The numerals 1 and 2 as well as 21–29, 31–39, 41–49 correspond with the counted in the grammatical gender, while the numerals 3–20, 30, 40 and 50 are characterized by polarity of gender, i.e. if the counted noun is masculine, the numeral would be feminine and vice versa. This polarity is typical of the Semitic languages and appears also in classical Arabic for example. The numerals 60, 100 and 1000 do not change according to the gender of the counted noun. Counted nouns more than two appear in the plural form. However, body parts which occur in pairs appear in the dual form  in Akkadian. e.g. šēpum (foot) becomes šēpān (two feet).

The ordinals are formed (with a few exceptions) by adding a case ending to the nominal form PaRuS (the P, R and S. must be substituted with the suitable consonants of the numeral). It is noted, however, that in the case of the numeral "one", the ordinal (masculine) and the cardinal number are the same. A metathesis occurs in the numeral "four".

Examples: erbē aššātum (four wives) (masculine numeral), meat ālānū (100 towns).

Syntax

Nominal phrases
Adjectives, relative clauses and appositions follow the noun.
While numerals precede the counted noun.
In the following table the nominal phrase erbēt šarrū dannūtum ša ālam īpušū abūya 'the four strong kings who built the city are my fathers' is analyzed:

Sentence syntax
Akkadian sentence order was Subject+Object+Verb (SOV), which sets it apart from most other ancient Semitic languages such as Arabic and Biblical Hebrew, which typically have a verb–subject–object (VSO)  word order.  (Modern South Semitic languages in Ethiopia also have SOV order, but these developed within historical times from the classical verb–subject–object (VSO) language Ge'ez.) It has been hypothesized that this word order was a result of influence from the Sumerian language, which was also SOV. There is evidence that native speakers of both languages were in intimate language contact, forming a single society for at least 500 years, so it is entirely likely that a sprachbund could have formed. Further evidence of an original VSO or SVO ordering can be found in the fact that direct and indirect object pronouns are suffixed to the verb.  Word order seems to have shifted to SVO/VSO late in the 1st millennium BC to the 1st millennium AD, possibly under the influence of Aramaic.

Vocabulary
The Akkadian vocabulary is mostly of Semitic origin. Although classified as 'East Semitic', many elements of its basic vocabulary find no evident parallels in related Semitic languages. For example: mārum 'son' (Semitic *bn), qātum 'hand' (Semitic *yd), šēpum 'foot' (Semitic *rgl), qabûm 'say' (Semitic *qwl), izuzzum 'stand' (Semitic *qwm), ana 'to, for' (Semitic *li).

Due to extensive contact with Sumerian and Aramaic, the Akkadian vocabulary contains many loan words from these languages. Aramaic loan words, however, were limited to the 1st centuries of the 1st millennium BC and primarily in the north and middle parts of Mesopotamia, whereas Sumerian loan words were spread in the whole linguistic area. Beside the previous languages, some nouns were borrowed from Hurrian, Kassite, Ugaritic and other ancient languages.
Since Sumerian and Hurrian, two non-Semitic languages, differ from Akkadian in word structure, only nouns and some adjectives (not many verbs) were borrowed from these languages. However, some verbs were borrowed (along with many nouns) from Aramaic and Ugaritic, both of which are Semitic languages.

The following table contains examples of loan words in Akkadian:

Akkadian was also a source of borrowing to other languages, above all Sumerian. Some examples are: Sumerian da-ri ('lastingly', from Akkadian dārum), Sumerian ra gaba ('riders, messenger', from Akkadian rākibum).

In 2011, the Oriental Institute of the University of Chicago completed a 21-volume dictionary, the Chicago Assyrian Dictionary, of the Akkadian language. The dictionary took 90 years to develop, beginning in 1921, with the first volume published in 1956. The completion of this work was hailed as a significant milestone for the study of the language by prominent academic Irving Finkel of the British Museum.

Sample text
The following is the 7th section of the Hammurabi law code, written in the mid-18th century BC:

Akkadian literature

Atrahasis Epic (early 2nd millennium BC)
Enûma Elish (c. 18th century BC)
Amarna letters (14th century BC)
Epic of Gilgamesh (Sin-liqe-unninni', Standard Babylonian version, 13th to 11th century BC)
Ludlul Bel Nemeqi

Notes

Sources

Aro, Jussi (1957). Studien zur mittelbabylonischen Grammatik.  Studia Orientalia 22.  Helsinki: Societas Orientalis Fennica.
Buccellati, Giorgio (1996).  A Structural Grammar of Babylonian.  Wiesbaden: Harrassowitz.
Buccellati, Giorgio (1997).  "Akkadian," The Semitic Languages.  Ed. Robert Hetzron.  New York: Routledge.  Pages 69–99.
Bussmann, Hadumod (1996). Routledge Dictionary of Language and Linguistics. New York: Routledge. 
Caplice, Richard (1980). Introduction to Akkadian. Rome: Biblical Institute Press. (1988,) (The 1980 edition is partly available online .)

 
Gelb, I.J. (1961).  Old Akkadian Writing and Grammar. Second edition.  Materials for the Assyrian Dictionary 2.  Chicago: University of Chicago Press.
Huehnergard, John (2005). A Grammar of Akkadian (Second Edition). Eisenbrauns. 
Marcus, David (1978). A Manual of Akkadian. University Press of America. 
Mercer, Samuel A B (1961). Introductory Assyrian Grammar. New York: F Ungar.  

Soden, Wolfram von (1952). Grundriss der akkadischen Grammatik. Analecta Orientalia 33. Roma: Pontificium Institutum Biblicum. (3rd ed.,)
Woodard, Roger D. The Ancient Languages of Mesopotamia, Egypt and Aksum. Cambridge University Press 2008. 

Further reading

General description and grammar
 Gelb, I. J. (1961). Old Akkadian writing and grammar. Materials for the Assyrian dictionary, no. 2. Chicago: University of Chicago Press. 
 Hasselbach, Rebecca. Sargonic Akkadian: A Historical and Comparative Study of the Syllabic Texts. Wiesbaden: Harrassowitz Verlag 2005. 
 Huehnergard, J. A Grammar of Akkadian (3rd ed. 2011). Harvard Semitic Museum Studies 45. (requires login)
 Huehnergard, J. (2005). A Key to A Grammar of Akkadian . Harvard Semitic Studies. Eisenbrauns.(requires login)
 Soden, Wolfram von: Grundriß der Akkadischen Grammatik. Analecta Orientalia. Bd 33. Rom 1995.  
 Streck, Michael P. Sprachen des Alten Orients. Wiss. Buchges., Darmstadt 2005.  
 Ungnad, Arthur: Grammatik des Akkadischen. Neubearbeitung durch L. Matouš, München 1969, 1979 (5. Aufl.).  
Woodard, Roger D. The Ancient Languages of Mesopotamia, Egypt and Aksum. Cambridge University Press 2008. 
Ikeda, Jun. Early Japanese and Early Akkadian Writing Systems. University of Tsukuba. 2007 

Textbooks
 Basics of Akkadian:  A Grammar Workbook and Glossary, By Gordon P. Hugenberg with Nancy L. Erickson, 2022.
 Rykle Borger: Babylonisch-assyrische Lesestücke. Rom 1963.(3., revidierte Auflage, 2006 Teil. I-II)
Part I: Elemente der Grammatik und der Schrift. Übungsbeispiele. Glossar.Part II: Die Texte in Umschrift.Part III: Kommentar. Die Texte in Keilschrift. Richard Caplice: Introduction to Akkadian. Biblical Institute Press, Rome 1988, 2002 (4.Aufl.).  
 Kaspar K. Riemschneider: Lehrbuch des Akkadischen. Verlag Enzyklopädie, Leipzig 1969, Langenscheidt Verlag Enzyklopädie, Leipzig 1992 (6. Aufl.).  
 Martin Worthington: "Complete Babylonian: Teach Yourself" London 2010 

Dictionaries
 Jeremy G. Black, Andrew George, Nicholas Postgate: A Concise Dictionary of Akkadian. Harrassowitz-Verlag, Wiesbaden 2000.   
 Wolfram von Soden: Akkadisches Handwörterbuch. 3 Bde. Wiesbaden 1958–1981.  
 Martha T. Roth, ed.: The Assyrian Dictionary of the Oriental Institute of the University of Chicago. 21 vols. in 26. Oriental Institute of the University of Chicago, Chicago 1956–2010. (available free online)

Akkadian cuneiform
Cherry, A. (2003). A basic neo-Assyrian cuneiform syllabary. Toronto, Ont: Ashur Cherry, York University.
Cherry, A. (2003). Basic individual logograms (Akkadian). Toronto, Ont: Ashur Cherry, York University.
Rykle Borger: Mesopotamisches Zeichenlexikon. Alter Orient und Altes Testament (AOAT). Bd 305. Ugarit-Verlag, Münster 2004. 
René Labat: Manuel d'Épigraphie Akkadienne. Paul Geuthner, Paris 1976, 1995 (6.Aufl.).  

Translations
Shin Shifra, Jacob Klein (1996). In Those Far Days. Tel Aviv, Am Oved and The Israeli Center for Libraries' project for translating Exemplary Literature to Hebrew. This is an anthology of Sumerian and Akkadian poetry, translated into Hebrew.

Technical literature on specific subjects
 Ignace J. Gelb: Old Akkadian Writing and Grammar. Materials for the Assyrian dictionary. Bd 2. University of Chicago Press, Chicago 1952, 1961, 1973.    
 Markus Hilgert: Akkadisch in der Ur III-Zeit. Rhema-Verlag, Münster 2002.   
 Walter Sommerfeld: Bemerkungen zur Dialektgliederung Altakkadisch, Assyrisch und Babylonisch. In: Alter Orient und Altes Testament'' (AOAT). Ugarit-Verlag, Münster 274.2003.

External links

Introduction to Cuneiform Script and the Akkadian language on The Open Richly Annotated Cuneiform Corpus (Oracc)
Akkadian cuneiform on Omniglot (Writing Systems and Languages of the World)

Akkadian Language Samples
A detailed introduction to Akkadian
Assyrian grammar with chrestomathy and glossary (1921) by Samuel A B Mercer
Akkadian-English-French Online Dictionary
Old Babylonian Text Corpus (includes dictionary)
The Assyrian Dictionary of the Oriental Institute of the University of Chicago (CAD)
Old Akkadian Writing and Grammar, by I. J. Gelb, 2nd Ed. (1961)
Glossary of Old Akkadian, by I. J. Gelb (1957)
List of 1280 Akkadian roots, with a representative verb form for each
Recordings of Assyriologists Reading Babylonian and Assyrian
Unicode Fonts for Ancient Scripts and Akkadian font for Ubuntu Linux-based operating system (ttf-ancient-fonts)
The Assyrian Dictionary of the Oriental Institute of the University of Chicago (CAD)
Akkadian in the wiki Glossing Ancient Languages (recommendations for the Interlinear Morphemic Glossing of Akkadian texts)

 
Languages attested from the 3rd millennium BC
Languages extinct in the 8th century BC
Cuneiform